Hayyim ben Abraham Uziel (Hebrew: חיים בן אברהם עזיאל) was a Sephardic Jew scholar and author who flourished in the latter half of the 16th century in the Ottoman Empire. He wrote Meḳor Ḥayyim (3 vols., Smyrna, n.d.), an ethical work in Judæo-Spanish.

References

16th-century writers from the Ottoman Empire
16th-century rabbis from the Ottoman Empire
Sephardi Jews from the Ottoman Empire
Judaeo-Spanish-language writers